Shakira (born 1977) is a Colombian singer-songwriter.

Shakira may also refer to:
 Shakira (album), her self-titled 2014 studio album

People 
Shakira (cheetah), one of the Cheetah stars of BBC's Big Cat Diary
Shakira Austin (born 1999), American basketball player
Shakira Caine (born 1947), Guyanese-British actress and fashion model
Shakira Martin (model) (1986–2016), Jamaican model
Shakira Martin (NUS president) (born 1988), British student politician
Shakira, fictional character from the Warlord series

See also

Hakirah (disambiguation)
Shakila
Shakir
Shakra

Arabic feminine given names